Inky Mark (born November 17, 1947) is a Canadian politician and a former member of the House of Commons of Canada, representing the Manitoba riding of Dauphin—Swan River—Marquette. Mark was a member of the Conservative Party of Canada, although he frequently criticized and took positions opposite the party and its leader, Stephen Harper. Mark ran in the 2015 federal election, noting that he is now a Green Party of Canada member but that he would still run as an independent. He lost significantly.

Early life
Mark was born in Taishan, China, and moved to Manitoba as a child. Mark's father and grandfather had emigrated from China to Canada some time previously, but were unable to bring their families with them as a result of provisions in the Chinese Immigration Act of 1923. Mark accompanied his mother when she fled China in 1953, and subsequently settled with his family in the Manitoba community of Gilbert Plains.

Education
Mark has a Bachelor of Arts from Brandon University and a Bachelor of Education degree from the University of Manitoba. Before entering political life, he worked as a high school teacher and small businessman. Mark also has a certificate in broadcasting and started a master's degree in education program, although he did not graduate.

Political career

Municipal politics
Mark's political career started when joined the Board of Directors of the Dauphin First United Church. He was subsequently elected to the Dauphin town council in 1991, and became the town's mayor in 1994.

Federal politics

Mark was first elected to the House of Commons in the federal election of 1997, running as a candidate of the Reform Party in the riding of Dauphin—Swan River. From 1997 to 2000, Mark was one of only three Chinese-Canadian MPs in the House of Commons.

The Reform Party dissolved itself in 2000 in favour of the Canadian Alliance, and Mark ran as a candidate of the new party in the federal election which followed.

On September 12, 2001, Mark left the Canadian Alliance caucus to sit as a member of the Democratic Representative Caucus, in alliance with the Progressive Conservative Party.

The DRC came to an end on April 10, 2002, when Stephen Harper replaced Day as Canadian Alliance leader.  Every other member of the DRC requested to be re-admitted to the Alliance; Mark did not join them, but instead decided to sit as an "Independent Conservative", with the intention of rejoining the Progressive Conservatives at their annual party convention later in the year; he had been a Progressive Conservative before the early 1990s.  Mark formally joined the Progressive Conservatives on August 27, 2002.

In December 2003, the Canadian Alliance and Progressive Conservative Party formally merged to create the new Conservative Party of Canada.  Mark supported the merger, and formally joined the new party's caucus on February 2, 2004. Mark was easily re-elected in the Canadian federal election of 2004.

In 2005, Mark alleged that Treasury Board President and Liberal MP Reg Alcock offered him an ambassadorship if he were to resign his seat. Alcock responded by saying, "Frankly, if I was going to recruit somebody, I'd go a little higher up the gene pool." Mark called this comment racist and filed a complaint with the Canadian Human Rights Commission. As the CHRC does not publish its investigations, it is not possible to know the outcome of this case.

Criticism and complaints
While a sitting MP, Mark gained a reputation as "an outsider" within the Conservative caucus.  Mark is and has been an outspoken critic of Prime Minister Stephen Harper, the Prime Minister's Office, and several sitting and former Conservative MPs. He frequently complained that Harper was controlling, and he responded by refusing to attend Conservative events. Mark has called Harper a "fascist" and complained that he runs a "top-down dictatorship". He says that the Central Intelligence Agency is controlled by the United States' Republican Party, and that the Republican Party installed Stephen Harper as the Canadian Prime Minister in order to sell out Canada to the United States.

Following the announcement of his resignation, Mark complained that the nomination race for his successor was rigged, and allowed Robert Sopuck to be acclaimed without competition.

Following his resignation as an MP, Mark stepped up his criticisms of the Harper government. He complained that the nomination race for the Conservative candidate following the resignation of Labrador MP Peter Penashue was rigged because Harper "wants a candidate he can control". He also complained that the nomination race to replace Merv Tweed was rigged, and that the eventual successor, Larry Maguire, was just a "rubber stamp" for Harper. Mark was featured prominently in the book Tragedy in the Commons, where almost every chapter quoted Mark's complaints about the way Harper's government was run.

Mark complained that the Conservatives' Constituent Information Management System (CIMS) was a secretive database used to track and control Canadians' information and voting preferences, and said that Harper could simply "switch off" this system to punish an MP.

Parliamentary work
For his tenure as an MP, Mark was always a "backbencher".

In 2001, as the Alliance's parliamentary critic for Immigration, Mark was responsible for expressing his party's position on the Liberal government's Immigration and Refugee Protection Act, which he did during the immigration controversy involving the Sklarzyk family who, as a result of an administrative error, was deported from Canada to Poland in May 2001. He also contributed to the parliamentary committee's work in drafting the final version of the bill, and was generally regarded by MPs from all parties as having made several constructive criticisms to the legislation.

However, on June 13, 2001, Mark's position on the bill was undercut by Canadian Alliance leader Stockwell Day, who delivered a speech in parliament supporting tighter restrictions against refugee claimants and reduced opportunities for rejected claimants to appeal to the Refugee Board.  Day's comments diverged from Mark's stated position on several particulars, and his speech was regarded as very surprising by many other MPs in the House of Commons. For example, Liberal MP Steve Mahoney referred to Day's comments as "treachery" towards Mark, for which he was ruled out of order by the Speaker.

In 2005, Mark's private members' Bill C-331 (Internment of Persons of Ukrainian Origin Recognition Act) was passed by the House of Commons and Senate of Canada, eventually resulting in the establishment of the Endowment Council of the Canadian First World War Internment Recognition Fund, supporting educational and commemorative projects recalling Canada's first national internment operations of 1914–1920.

Federal resignation and return to municipal politics
Mark announced in June 2009 that he would be resigning before the next federal election. On August 16, 2010, he announced that he would step down as an MP on September 15 to campaign for another term as mayor of Dauphin. However, he lost to Eric Irwin.

Return to federal politics and switch to Green Party of Canada
Mark announced on November 13, 2014, that he would be running as an independent candidate for the 2015 federal election in Dauphin—Swan River—Neepawa, which includes nearly all of his old riding. Mark announced that he is now a member of the Green Party of Canada, but would still seek election in 2015 as an independent candidate. Mark finished a distant fourth behind Sopuck, garnering only eight percent of the vote.

Electoral record

^  Change is from the total of Progressive Conservative and Canadian Alliance votes in the 2000 election.

|-

Note: Canadian Alliance vote is compared to Reform Party vote in 1997 election.

|-

References

External links

1947 births
Living people
Members of the House of Commons of Canada from Manitoba
Members of the United Church of Canada
People from Taishan, Guangdong
Chinese emigrants to Canada
Reform Party of Canada MPs
Canadian Alliance MPs
Progressive Conservative Party of Canada MPs
Conservative Party of Canada MPs
Mayors of Dauphin, Manitoba
Mark, Inkey
Naturalized citizens of Canada
Politicians from Jiangmen
Independent candidates in the 2015 Canadian federal election